Minuscule 420 (in the Gregory-Aland numbering), is a Greek minuscule manuscript of the New Testament, on parchment. Palaeographically it has been assigned to the 10th century.
Marginalia are almost full (no lectionary markings).

Description 

The codex contains the text of the Gospel of Matthew and Gospel of Mark on 127 parchment leaves. It is written in one column per page, in 22 lines per page.

There is also a division according to the Ammonian Sections (in Mark 241 Sections, the last in 16:20), with references to the Eusebian Canons (written below Ammonian Section numbers).

Text 

It was written by several different hands, with readings from other copies.

Kurt Aland did not place the Greek text of the codex in any Category.

History 

In 1786 the manuscript was examined for Andreas Birch. The manuscript was added to the list of New Testament manuscripts by Scholz (1794–1852).
C. R. Gregory saw the manuscript in 1886.

The manuscript is currently housed at the Library of the University (F. V. 18) in Messina.

See also 

 List of New Testament minuscules
 Biblical manuscript
 Textual criticism

References

Further reading 

 

Greek New Testament minuscules
10th-century biblical manuscripts